The Petronas Towers (Malay: Menara Berkembar Petronas), also known as the Petronas Twin Towers or KLCC Twin Towers, are a pair of 88-storey supertall skyscrapers in Kuala Lumpur, Malaysia, standing at . From 1998 to 2003, they were officially designated as the tallest buildings in the world until they were surpassed by the 2004 completion of the Taipei 101.  The Petronas Towers are the world's tallest twin skyscrapers and remained the tallest buildings in Malaysia until 2019, when they were surpassed by The Exchange 106. The Petronas Towers are a major landmark of Kuala Lumpur, along with the nearby Kuala Lumpur Tower and Merdeka 118, and are visible in many places across the city.

History and architecture
The Petronas Towers' structural system is a tube in tube design, invented by architect Fazlur Rahman Khan. Applying a tube-structure for extreme tall buildings is a common phenomenon.
The 88-floor towers are constructed largely of reinforced concrete, with a steel and glass facade designed to resemble motifs found in Islamic art, a reflection of Malaysia's Muslim religion. Another Islamic influence on the design is that the cross section of the towers is based on a Rub el Hizb, albeit with circular sectors added to meet office space requirements. The circular sectors are similar to the bottom part of the Qutub Minar.

The towers were designed by Argentine-American architect César Pelli. A distinctive postmodern style was chosen to create a 21st-century icon for Kuala Lumpur, Malaysia. Planning on the Petronas Towers started on 1 January 1992 and included rigorous tests and simulations of wind and structural loads on the design.
The construction of the superstructure commenced on 1 April 1994. Interiors with furniture were completed on 1 January 1996, the spires of Tower 1 and Tower 2 were completed on 1 March 1996, 3 years after its construction was started, and the first batch of Petronas personnel moved into the building on 1 January 1997. The building was officially opened by the Prime Minister of Malaysia, Tun Dr. Mahathir bin Mohamad, on 31 August 1999. The twin towers were built on the site of Kuala Lumpur's race track. It was the tallest structure in Malaysia at the time of its completion. Test boreholes found that the original construction site effectively sat on the edge of a cliff. One half of the site was decayed limestone while the other half was soft rock. The entire site was moved  to allow the buildings to sit entirely on the soft rock. The concrete raft foundation, comprising  of concrete was continuously poured through a period of 54 hours for each tower. The foundations were completed within 12 months by Bachy Soletanche and required massive amounts of concrete.
 
As a result of the Malaysian government specifying that the buildings be completed in six years, two construction consortia were hired to meet the deadline, one for each tower. Tower 1, the west tower (left in the top-right photograph) was built by a Japanese consortium led by the Hazama Corporation (JA Jones Construction Co., MMC Engineering Services Sdn Bhd, Ho Hup Construction Co. Bhd and Mitsubishi Corp) while Tower 2, the east tower (right in the top-right photograph) was built by a South Korean consortium led by the Samsung C&T Corporation (Kukdong Engineering & Construction and Syarikat Jasatera Sdn Bhd).

Early into construction a batch of concrete failed a routine strength test causing construction to come to a complete halt. All the completed floors were tested but it was found that only one had used a bad batch and it was demolished. As a result of the concrete failure, each new batch was tested before being poured. The halt in construction had cost US$700,000 per day and led to three separate concrete plants being set up on the site to ensure that if one produced a bad batch, the other two could continue to supply concrete. The sky bridge contract was completed by Kukdong Engineering & Construction. Tower 2 (Samsung C&T) became the first to reach the world's tallest building at the time.

Due to the huge cost of importing steel, the towers were constructed on a cheaper radical design of super high-strength reinforced concrete. High-strength concrete is a material familiar to Asian contractors and twice as effective as steel in sway reduction; however, it makes the building twice as heavy on its foundation as a comparable steel building. Supported by 23-by-23 metre concrete cores and an outer ring of widely spaced super columns, the towers use a sophisticated structural system that accommodates its slender profile and provides 560,000 square metres of column-free office space. Below the twin towers is Suria KLCC, a shopping mall, and Petronas Philharmonic Hall, the home of the Malaysian Philharmonic Orchestra.

Notable events

 On 15 April 1999, Felix Baumgartner set the world record for BASE jumping (since broken) by jumping off a window cleaning crane on the Petronas Towers.
 Thousands of people were evacuated on 12 September 2001 after a bomb threat the day after the September 11 attacks destroyed the World Trade Center towers in New York City. Bomb disposal squads found no explosives in the towers, but they nevertheless evacuated the premises. Workers and shoppers were allowed to return three hours later, around noon. No one was hurt during the evacuation.
 On the evening of 4 November 2005, a fire broke out in the cinema complex of the Suria KLCC shopping centre below the Petronas Towers, triggering panic among patrons. There were no reports of injuries. The buildings were largely empty, except the shopping mall, Suria KLCC, because of the late hour; the only people involved were moviegoers and some diners in restaurants.
 On the morning of 1 September 2009, French urban climber Alain "Spiderman" Robert, using only his bare hands and feet and with no safety devices, scaled to the top of Tower Two in just under 2 hours after two previous efforts had ended in arrest. In his first attempt on 20 March 1997, police arrested him at the 60th floor, 28 floors away from the "summit". His second attempt, on 20 March 2007, exactly 10 years later, was also stopped on the same floor, though on the other tower.

Anchor tenants
Tower One is fully occupied by Petronas and a number of its subsidiaries and associate companies, while the office spaces in Tower Two are mostly available for lease to other companies. A number of companies have offices in Tower Two, including SapuraOMV Upstream (Sarawak) Inc., Huawei Technologies, AVEVA, Al Jazeera English, Carigali Hess, Bloomberg, Boeing, IBM, Khazanah Nasional Berhad, McKinsey & Co, WIPRO Limited, TCS, HCL Technologies, Krawler, Microsoft, The Agency (a modelling company) and Reuters.

Floor distribution

(the given chart is the floor arrangement according to the level arrangement.)

Features

Suria KLCC

Suria KLCC is a  upscale retail center at the foot of the Petronas Towers. It features mostly foreign luxury goods and high-street labels. Its attractions include an art gallery, an underwater aquarium and also a Science center. Boasting approximately 300 stores, Suria KLCC is touted as one of the largest shopping malls in Malaysia. The Petronas Philharmonic Hall, also built at the base of the towers, is frequently associated with Suria KLCC's floorspace. During holidays or celebration days, Suria KLCC is the top spot to see the beautiful decorations especially at the main entrances and also in Centre Court. It also promotes the uniqueness and beauty of Malaysia’s cultural diversity towards the visitors.

KLCC Park

Skybridge
The towers feature a double decker skybridge connecting the two towers on the 41st and 42nd floors, which is the highest 2-story bridge in the world. It is not attached to the main structure, but is instead designed to slide in and out of the towers to prevent it from breaking, as the towers sway several feet in towards and away from each other during high winds. It also provides some structural support to the towers in these occasions. The same floor is also known as the podium, since visitors going to higher levels have to change elevators here. Dynamic analyses were performed and iterated to support the final design by studying the structural behavior of the twin towers to time-varying loads such as earthquakes and wind.The skybridge is open to all visitors, but tickets are limited to about 1,000 people per day, with around half available to be purchased online, and the other half obtained on a first-come, first-served basis. Initially, the visit was free but in 2010, the tickets started being sold by Petronas. Visitors can choose to opt for package one which is just a visit to the skybridge or go for package two to go to the skybridge and all the way to level 86. Visitors are only allowed on the 41st floor as the 42nd floor can only be used by the tenants of the building.

The skybridge also acts as a safety device, so that in the event of a fire or other emergency in one tower, tenants can evacuate by crossing the skybridge to the other tower. The total evacuation triggered by a bomb hoax on 12 September 2001 (the day after the September 11 attacks destroyed the twin towers of the World Trade Center in New York City) showed that the bridge would not be useful if both towers need to be emptied simultaneously, as the capacity of the staircases was insufficient for such an event. Plans thus call for the lifts to be used if both towers need to be evacuated, and a successful drill following the revised plan was conducted in 2005.

After being constructed on the ground, the skybridge was lifted into place on the towers over a period of three days in July 1995. Instead of being directly connected to the towers, the skybridge can shift or slide in and out of them to counterbalance any effect from the wind. Residing on the 41st and 42nd floors, the skybridge connects a conference room, an executive dining room and a prayer room.

Lift system
The main bank of lifts is located in the centre of each tower. All main lifts are double-decker with the lower deck of the lift taking passengers to even-numbered floors and upper deck to odd-numbered floors. To reach an odd-numbered floor from ground level, passengers must take an escalator to the upper deck of the lift.

There are 29 double-deck passenger elevators, but there are different sets that service certain floors of the towers, specifically two sets of six of these double-deck passenger elevators to floors 1–23 and 1–37 respectively. Another set of 5 passenger lifts transport passengers to the 41st and 42nd floors where they can switch lifts to reach the upper zones of the buildings, each double-deck passenger lift with the capacity of 52 passengers or, 26 passengers per deck. There are also 6 heavy-duty elevators for utility.

The lift operating chart of the Petronas Towers
 PL7A-PL7C (Tower 1) & PL8A-PL8C (Tower 2) (Parking & Podium Passenger Lift): P5-P1, C, G, 1, 2, 2M, 3–5 (PL7A & PL8A non-stop at level 2M)
 SL6 (Tower 1) & SL7 (Tower 2) (Parking & Podium Service Lift): P5-P1, 1, 2, 2M, 3–5 (SL7 non-stop at level 2M)
 PL14 (Tower 1) & PL15 (Tower 2) (Concert Passenger Lift): G, 2, 2M, 3, 4
 A1-A6 (Tower 1) & A7-A12 (Tower 2) (Bank A Passenger Lift): G/1, 8–23
 B1-B6 (Tower 1) & B7-B12 (Tower 2) (Bank B Passenger Lift): G/1, 23–37
 - (Tower 1) & - (Tower 2) (Conference Shuttle Lift): 36, 37, 40–43
 C1-C6 (Tower 1) & C7-C12 (Tower 2) (Bank C Passenger Lift): 41/42, 44–61
 D1-D3 (Tower 1) & D4-D6 (Tower 2) (Bank D Passenger Lift): 41/42, 61, 69–83
 E1-E3 (Tower 1) & E4-E6 (Tower 2) (Bank E Passenger Lift): 41/42, 61–73
 TE1-TE2 (Tower 1) & TE3-TE4 (Tower 2) (Upper Level Passenger Lift): 83, 85, 86
 - (Tower 1) & - (Tower 2) (Shuttle Lift): G/1, 41/42
 S1-S2 (Tower 1) & S4-S5 (Tower 2) (Service Lift): P1, C, G, 2–6, 8–38, 40–84
 S3 (Tower 1) & S6 (Tower 2) (Lower Level Service Lift): P1, C, G, 2–6, 8–37
 F1-F2 (Tower 1) & F3-F4 (Tower 2) (Fireman Service Lift): P1, C, CM, G, 1–6, 8–38, 40–84, 84M1, 84M2, 85, 86 (F1 & F3 non-stop at Level 1)

Service building
The service building is to the east of the Petronas Towers and contains the chiller plant system and the cooling towers to keep the Petronas Towers cool and comfortable.

Ticketing system
In order to visit the Petronas Towers, visitors must first purchase tickets. Tickets can be purchased online or at the counter. Discounted tickets for seniors are available for those 55 years of age and above. Queues for tickets can get quite long sometimes. The complete ticketing system is provided by the Malaysian-based Longbow Technologies Sdn Bhd.

In popular culture
 The towers are prominently featured and mentioned by name in the 1999 film Entrapment, with numerous scenes filmed at the towers, with the climax set on the skybridge. CGI was used to add slums to the bottom of the towers.
 The towers appear in the first episode of the US TV series 24.
 Several scenes of the Bollywood film Don: The Chase Begins Again were also filmed in the Petronas Towers and its skybridge.
 In Part 1 of the Phineas and Ferb episode "Phineas and Ferb Save Summer!", the towers are visible during the musical number "Summer All Over the World".
 Eidos Interactive has twice used the towers for inspiration in their video games. In the 2002 Hitman 2: Silent Assassin, the Malaysia-based levels Basement Killing, The Graveyard Shift, and The Jacuzzi Job all take place in the Petronas Towers. In 2010's Just Cause 2, the fictional Panau Falls Casino is based on the Petronas Towers.
 A 2002 episode of the animated series Jackie Chan Adventures titled "When Pigs Fly" (Season 3, Episode 6), features the towers.
 A 2002 episode of The Amazing Race 3 ("Why Did You Have To Take Your Pants Off?") featured the Petronas Towers as part of a task in which the competing team had to have their photograph taken in front of the towers. The towers were seen again 21 seasons later on an episode of The Amazing Race 24 ("Smarter, Not Harder").
 The towers made its appearance, in the animated series Totally Spies episode titled "Man or Machine".
 The opening of the 2010 film Fair Game had scenes with the twin towers along with the skyline of Kuala Lumpur.
 A number of scenes for the 2012 Hong Kong-Chinese action film Viral Factor included shots of the twin towers.
 In the 2016 film Independence Day: Resurgence, the towers are dropped onto the London Tower Bridge by aliens, with a character commenting: "They like to get the landmarks".
In the 2009 History Channel original program Life After People, the towers make an appearance in the episode titled "Bound and Buried", and it is stated that the towers would survive approximately 500 years without human maintenance, eventually collapsing from the weathering and erosion of Malaysia's tropical climate.
 In 2005, the towers are visible in the album cover of Controversy Loves Company by American pop punk band The Audition.

Photo gallery

See also

 Petronas Tower 3
 The Exchange 106
 List of skyscrapers
 List of tallest buildings and structures in the world
 List of tallest buildings in Kuala Lumpur
 List of tallest buildings in Malaysia
 List of tallest freestanding structures in the world
 Menara Telekom
 Merdeka PNB 118
 Skyscraper Index
 Vanity height

References

External links

 Petronas Towers official website
 Petronas Tower 1 on CTBUH Skyscraper Center
 Petronas Tower 2 on CTBUH Skyscraper Center
 
 Introduction and Overview of the Petronas Towers
 

1998 establishments in Malaysia
César Pelli buildings
Former world's tallest buildings
MSC Malaysia
Office buildings completed in 1998
Office buildings in Kuala Lumpur
Towers
Postmodern architecture in Malaysia
Skyscraper office buildings in Kuala Lumpur
Tourist attractions in Kuala Lumpur
Twin towers